Gârbău may refer to the following places in Romania:
 Gârbău, Cluj, a commune in Cluj County
 Gârbău (Durbav), a tributary of the Durbav in Brașov County
 Gârbău (Someșul Mic), a tributary of the Someșul Mic in Cluj County
 Gârbău (Secaș), a tributary of the Secaș in Alba County
 Gârbăul Dejului, a tributary of the Someșul Mare